Cetomimidae is a family of small, deep-sea cetomimiform fish. Females are known as flabby whalefishes, Males are known as bignose fishes, while juveniles are known as tapetails and were formerly thought to be in a separate family, dubbed Mirapinnidae. Adults exhibit extreme sexual dimorphism, and the adult males were once thought to be exemplars of still another family, Megalomycteridae.

Thought to have a circumglobal distribution throughout the Southern Hemisphere, Cetomimidae are the most diverse family of whalefishes. The largest species, Gyrinomimus grahami, reaches a length of some 40 cm. They are distinguished from other whalefishes by their loose, scaleless skin and lack of photophores.

Description 
Living at extreme, lightless depths, adult females have evolved an exceptionally well-developed lateral line system. Their eyes are either very small or vestigial and instead this system of sensory pores (running the length of the body) helps the fish to accurately perceive its surroundings by detecting vibrations. Named after the baleen whale-like bodies of adult females (from the Greek ketos meaning "whale" or "sea monster" and mimos meaning "imitative"), Cetomimidae have large mouths, and their dorsal and anal fins are set far back of the head. All fins lack spines, and the pelvic fins are absent. The fish also lack swim bladders.

Cetomimidae is a red to orange-brown color in life, with the fins and jaws, in particular, being brightly colored. Longer electromagnetic wavelengths (such as red and orange) do not penetrate into the fish's realm: animals which have evolved at this depth cannot see these longer wavelengths, rendering the fish effectively black.

Their stomachs are highly distensible, allowing adult females to pursue prey otherwise too large for them to eat.  Adult males do not eat at all, their jaws having fused shut during the transformation from their juvenile phase. Males retain the shells of prey consumed while still in the juvenile form and continue to metabolize these shells throughout the remainder of their lives.  Both traits may have evolved due to extreme food scarcity in the ocean depths.

Though little is known regarding their life history, new discoveries are being made. "[They] live in the oceanic bathypelagic realm (1000–4000 m) [which is] a nutrient-poor habitat. Most fishes living there have pelagic larvae using the rich waters of the upper 200 m. [They have remarkable] developmental changes and life-history strategies [that allow it to cope with occupying] such as contrasting environments." This species is an "extreme example of ontogenetic metamorphoses and sexual dimorphism in vertebrates."  In early 2009, the Royal Society published an article detailing the discovery "that three families with greatly differing morphologies, Mirapinnidae (tapetails), Megalomycteridae (bignose fishes), and Cetomimidae (whalefishes), are larvae, males, and females, respectively, of a single-family, Cetomimidae." Apparently "morphological transformations involve dramatic changes in the skeleton, most spectacularly in the head, and are correlated with distinctly different feeding mechanisms. Larvae have small, upturned mouths and gorge on copepods. Females have huge gapes with long, horizontal jaws and specialized gill arches allowing them to capture larger prey. Males cease feeding, lose their stomach and esophagus, and apparently convert the energy from the bolus of copepods found in all transforming males to a massive liver that supports them throughout adult life."

Like many deep-sea fishes, Cetomimidae is thought to undergo nightly vertical migrations; they feed within the upper 700 m of the water column by starlight and retreat back to the abyssal depths by daybreak. Judging by the latest studies, the younger fish seem to frequent shallower water more than the adults do.

Tapetails 
Before a report released in January 2009, the juveniles of the species were thought to belong to a separate taxonomic family Mirapinnidae in the Cetomimiform order, with three genera Eutaeniophorus, Mirapinna, and  Parataeniophorus.
These "tapetails," as they are also known, had been known exclusively from immature specimens, which live in shallower waters than the adults.

The tapetails are named for their caudal fins, which include a narrow streamer that may be longer than the fish's body. The genus Mirapinna, known as the hairyfish, lacks the streamer, but has multiple hair-like growths on its body. All mirapinnids lack scales and fin rays. They feed on small crustaceans.

References 

Classification, diversity and biology of whalefishes and relatives

 
Marine fish families